Nathan French (born 20 April 1990) is a British volleyball player. French was born in Chelmsford, Essex and he competed for Great Britain at the 2012 Summer Olympics. French was the youngest member (at age 22) of the men’s team and started playing the sport in school when he was 13. French has also played professionally in Spain, France, Germany and Israel.

Background
French started playing volleyball when he was 13, and at age 16, he decided to dedicate his life to it. He was attending the Boswells School in Chelmsford at the time. It was during his teens when the school formed an academy for the sport. The volleyball academy at the school is now considered to be one of the best in the country.  French said of his time at the school; "I wasn't any better than anyone else. It wasn't like that at all. I maybe wasn't even as good as the others." In July 2005, when London announced their winning bid for the Olympic's, French decided then that he was going to be a part of it.

Team GB
In June 2012, it was announced that French would play for Team GB at the Olympics. French, who was 22 years old at the time, was the youngest member of the team. French said after the announcement was made that "it's a twenty minute ride on the train...and for it to be in London just up the road from me, just a stone's throw away...it's incredible." French has also played professionally in Spain for Tenerife and in southern France for Avignon.

Current

Nathan has seen more than 70,000 young people across the UK to inspire and raise awareness of childhood obesity, delivering healthy workshops and fun volleyball activities to more than 250 primary schools.  He is a qualified life coach and is a director of Your Marketing Guy; a digital marketing agency and consultancy to help business improve their online presence and generate more leads and sales through various online strategies.

Summer Olympics

The volleyball tournaments were played between July 28 and August 12. The indoor men's competition took place at Earls Court Exhibition Centre, in west London. The men's volleyball squad did not win any of their games and were eliminated from the tournament. The medal winners were (men's division):

 - Gold
 - Silver
  - Bronze

See also
2012 Summer Paralympics
2012 Winter Youth Olympics

References

External links
Your Marketing Guy.  Digital Marketing Agency in Chelmsford, Essex
Nathan French profile at British Volleyball
Arsenal's 2012 Olympians: Nathan French interview with French at Arsenal
Photos of Nathan French at Facebook

English men's volleyball players
Volleyball players at the 2012 Summer Olympics
Olympic volleyball players of Great Britain
1990 births
Living people
Sportspeople from Chelmsford